The Bandit of Port Avon (Italian:Il bandito di Port-Aven) is a 1914 Italian silent film directed by Roberto Roberti and starring Bice Valerian. It was made by the Turin-based Aquila Films.

Cast
 Giuseppe De Witten 
 Giulio Donadio 
 Roberto Roberti 
 Bice Valerian 
 Oreste Visalli
 Claudia Zambuto

References

Bibliography
 Giorgio Bertellini. Italy in Early American Cinema: Race, Landscape, and the Picturesque. Indiana University Press, 2010.

External links

1914 films
1910s Italian-language films
Films directed by Roberto Roberti
Italian silent feature films
Italian black-and-white films